Australia competed at the 2016 Summer Olympics in Rio de Janeiro, Brazil, from 5 to 21 August 2016. Australia is one of only five countries to have sent athletes to every Summer Olympics of the modern era, alongside Great Britain, France, Greece, and Switzerland.

At the end of these Olympics, Australia was ranked in tenth position on the medal table with a total of 29 medals (8 gold, 11 silver, and 10 bronze). This was Australia's lowest medal tally and lowest rank since the 1992 Olympics in Barcelona where Australia also ranked tenth but only won 27 medals.

Medallists

The following Australian competitors won medals at the games. In the by discipline sections below, medallists' names are bolded.

|  style="text-align:left; width:78%; vertical-align:top;"|

|  style="text-align:left; width:22%; vertical-align:top;"|

* – Indicates the athlete competed in preliminaries but not the final relay.

Competitors
Kitty Chiller, who competed as a modern pentathlete at the 2000 Summer Olympics in Sydney, was selected as the team's Chef de Mission, the first female to hold the role for Australia.

Funding
In May 2014 Australian Sports Minister Peter Dutton announced that 650 Australian athletes identified as medal prospects would receive funding directly from a newly designed program that reallocated A$1.6 million from the Direct Athlete Support program.

In the lead up to the Rio Olympics, the Australian Sports Commission advised that it had invested A$376.7 million to high performance sports in the Rio cycle 2012–2016. This amount includes funding to Winter Olympics and non-Olympic sports.

Archery

Three Australian archers qualified for the men's events after having secured a top eight finish in the team recurve at the 2015 World Archery Championships in Copenhagen, Denmark. Another Australian archer has been added to the squad by finishing in the top two of the women's individual recurve at the Oceania Qualification Tournament in Nuku'alofa, Tonga.

The men's team (Potts, Tyack, and Worth) was officially named to the Australian roster for the Games on 31 May 2016, with Alice Ingley joining them on her Olympic debut in the women's individual archery one month later.

Athletics (track and field)

Australian athletes have so far achieved qualifying standards in the following athletics events (up to a maximum of 3 athletes in each event). The team selected its athletes with a specific qualifying standard based on the results at the 2016 Australian Championships and Olympic Trials (31 March to 3 April) in Sydney.

On 8 January 2016, the Australian Olympic Committee had selected the two long-distance runners (one each in both men's and women's 10,000 m) and three race walkers, including three-time Olympic medallist  Jared Tallent, in the men's . Twenty-seven track and field athletes were announced on 3 April 2016, following the completion of the Australian Championships. Six marathon runners (three per gender) were named to the Australian team on 12 May 2016, and were followed by three  race walkers and one long-distance runner at the first of week of June 2016.

On 29 June 2016, sprint hurdler and reigning Olympic champion Sally Pearson withdrew from the Games due to a hamstring injury, with middle-distance runner Melissa Duncan following her with the same incident two weeks later.

On 30 July 2016, sprinter Josh Clarke withdrew from the Games after failing to fully recover from a hamstring injury that he suffered in the early months of the year.

Monica Brennan was selected for the women's 4 × 400 m relay team, but did not run in either heat or final.

Men
Track & road events

Women

Field events
Men

Women

Combined events – Men's decathlon

Badminton

Australia has qualified a total of six badminton players for each of the following events into the Olympic tournament based on the BWF World Rankings as of 5 May 2016: one entry each in the men's and women's singles, as well as the pair each in the men's and mixed doubles through the Oceania continental representation system.

With the option to select a maximum of two events under the continental representation system, the Australian Olympic Committee had decided to accept invitations for the men's doubles (Chau & Serasinghe) and mixed doubles (Middleton & Choo) instead. As there were no other Oceania places taken up in the women's singles, Taiwanese-born Chen Hsuan-yu (world no. 74) qualified directly on the World Rankings.

Basketball

Men's tournament

Australia men's basketball team qualified for the Olympics by winning the 2015 FIBA Oceania Championship in Melbourne and Wellington.

Team roster

Group play

Quarterfinal

Semifinal

Bronze medal match

Women's tournament

Australia women's basketball team qualified for the Olympics by winning the 2015 FIBA Oceania Championships in Melbourne and Tauranga.

Team roster

Group play

Quarterfinal

Boxing

Australia has entered three boxers to compete in each of the following weight classes into the Olympic boxing tournament. Daniel Lewis, Jason Whateley, and 2014 Commonwealth Games champion Shelley Watts claimed their Olympic spots at the 2016 Asia & Oceania Qualification Tournament in Qian'an, China.

Canoeing

Slalom
Australian canoeists have qualified a maximum of one boat in each of the following classes through the 2015 ICF Canoe Slalom World Championships and the 2016 Oceania Championships. They must also compete at the Australian Open and in two trials of the Oceania Championships, both held in Penrith, New South Wales, to assure their selection to the nation's Olympic slalom canoeing team.

On 25 February 2016, the Australian Olympic Committee had announced the entire Olympic team of slalom canoeists for the Games, including 2012 Olympic silver medallist Jessica Fox in the women's K-1.

Sprint
Australian canoeists have qualified one boat in each of the following events through the 2015 ICF Canoe Sprint World Championships and the 2016 Oceania Championships (the first of 2 Olympic selection trials). They must also compete at the 2016  Australian National Sprint Championships in Perth ( 2 to 8 March) to assure their selection to the nation's Olympic sprint canoeing team.

The entire Olympic team of sprint canoe and kayak paddlers were named on 16 March 2016, featuring two of men's K-4 1000 m champions Murray Stewart and Jacob Clear, 2008 Olympic gold medallist Ken Wallace, and three-time bronze medallist Martin Marinov, who has been set to appear at his fifth Games. Meanwhile, London 2012 Olympian Naomi Flood became the last sprint canoeist to join the Australian team for the Games at the ICF World Cup meet ( 18 to 20 May) in Duisburg, Germany.

Men

Women

Qualification Legend: FA = Qualify to final (medal); FB = Qualify to final B (non-medal)

Cycling

Road
Australian riders qualified for the following quota places in the men's and women's Olympic road race by virtue of their top 15 final national ranking in the 2015 UCI World Tour (for men) and top 22 in the UCI World Ranking (for women).

Three men's road riders (Rohan Dennis, Simon Gerrans and Richie Porte) were named to the Australian cycling team for the Games on 5 July 2016, with the women (Gracie Elvin, Katrin Garfoot, Rachel Neylan and Amanda Spratt) joining them a week later. On 17 July, Gerrans withdrew from the squad, three days after fracturing his collarbone in a crash during Stage 12 of the 2016 Tour de France. Instead, Simon Clarke took over the vacant spot.

Men

Women

Track
Following the completion of the 2016 UCI Track Cycling World Championships, Australian riders have accumulated spots in both men's and women's team pursuit, and men's and women's team sprint, as well as both the men's and women's omnium. As a result of their place in the men's and women's team sprint, Australia has won the right to enter two riders in both men's and women's sprint and men's and women's keirin.

The full Australian track cycling team was officially named on 5 July 2016, with Anna Meares looking to defend the women's Olympic sprint title at her fourth straight Games.

Sprint

Team sprint

Qualification legend: FA=Gold medal final; FB=Bronze medal final

Pursuit

Keirin

Omnium

Mountain biking
Australian mountain bikers qualified for two men's and one women's quota place into the Olympic cross-country race, as a result of the nation's eighth-place finish for men and fifteenth for women in the UCI Olympic Ranking List of 25 May 2016. London 2012 Olympian Rebecca Henderson was the first mountain biker to be officially named to the Australian team on 5 July 2016, with Daniel McConnell and Scott Bowden joining her one-week later.

BMX
Australian riders qualified for three men's and two women's quota places in BMX at the Olympics, as a result of the nation's third-place finish for men and first for women in the UCI Olympic Ranking List of 31 May 2016. The BMX cycling team was named to the Australian roster on 5 July 2016.

Diving 

Australian divers qualified for eight individual spots and one synchronized team at the Olympics through the 2015 FINA World Championships and the 2016 FINA World Cup series. They must compete at the 2016 Australian Open Championships to assure their selection to the Olympic team. A total of nine divers (four men and five women) were named to the Olympic team on 29 June 2016, with Beijing 2008 silver medallist Melissa Wu leading them for her third straight Games. Brittany O'Brien replaced Brittany Broben who withdrew due to injury.

Men

Women

Equestrian

Australia is expected to be confirmed as having qualified a complete team in dressage by finishing in tenth position in the team event at the 2014 FEI World Equestrian Games, held in Normandy, France. The team will qualify as the top ranked nation from South East Asia, Oceania, Africa and the Middle East. The Australian eventing team also qualified for Rio by finishing fifth at the same World  Games.

Dressage
Dressage shortlist is expected to be announced by 15 April. Final dressage team was named after the FEI Nations Cup event in Rotterdam (23–26 June 2016).

Having been selected initially, Kelly Layne later withdraw following a minor injury to her horse. She was replaced by Sue Hearn on 23 July.

Eventing
The eventing team was named on 12 July 2016.

"#" indicates that the score of this rider does not count in the team competition, since only the best three results of a team are counted.

Jumping
First two members of the jumping team (Keach and Tops-Alexander) were announced on 28 April 2016. The two remaining spots, Paterson-Robinson and Williams, were named on 28 June 2016, after FEI Nations Cup events in Linz, Odense and Sopot.

"#" indicates that the score of this rider does not count in the team competition, since only the best three results of a team are counted.

Field hockey

Summary

Men's tournament

Australia men's field hockey team qualified for the Olympics by having achieved a top three finish at the second stop of the 2014–15 Men's FIH Hockey World League Semifinals. Only three nations qualified through this route, but India had already secured qualification as the continental champion after the team's success at the 2014 Asian Games, leaving the remaining teams automatically received three quotas.

Team roster

Group play

Quarterfinal

Women's tournament

Australia women's field hockey team qualified for the Olympics by having achieved a top three finish at the second stop of the 2014–15 Women's FIH Hockey World League Semifinals.

Team roster

Group play

Quarterfinal

Football (soccer)

Women's tournament

Australia women's soccer team qualified for the Olympics, by virtue of a top two finish in the 2015–16 AFC Olympic Qualifying Tournament in Japan.

Team roster

Group play

Quarterfinal

Golf

Australia has entered four golfers (two per gender) into the Olympic tournament for the first time since 1904. Scott Hend (world no. 81), Marcus Fraser (world no. 86), and Korean-born Minjee Lee (world no. 14) and Su-Hyun Oh (world no. 41) qualified directly among the top 60 eligible players for their respective individual events based on the IGF World Rankings as of 11 July 2016.

Adam Scott, seventh in the men's world rankings, announced in April 2016 that he would not compete in Rio, choosing instead to focus on the 2016 PGA Tour. Marc Leishman, who was in line to be selected following Scott's withdrawal announced on 5 May 2016 that he would not play in Rio as his wife Audrey is recovering from toxic shock syndrome.

Gymnastics

Artistic
Australia has entered one artistic gymnast into the Olympic competition, failing to send any of the all-around teams for the first time since 1988. This Olympic berth had been awarded to the Australian female gymnast, who participated in the apparatus and all-around events at the Olympic Test Event in Rio de Janeiro. London 2012 Olympian Larrissa Miller was selected to her second Olympic team, as a result of her performances at the Australian Championships.

Women

Rhythmic 
Australia has qualified one rhythmic gymnast in the individual all-around for the Games by picking up the continental spot as Oceania's sole representative at the Olympic Test Event in Rio de Janeiro. The slot was awarded to rookie Danielle Prince.

Trampoline
Australia has qualified one gymnast in the men's trampoline by virtue of a top six finish at the 2016 Olympic Test Event in Rio de Janeiro. The slot was awarded to London 2012 Olympian Blake Gaudry.

Judo

Australia has qualified a total of seven judokas for each of the following weight classes at the Games. Six of them (four men and two women), including brothers Joshua and Nathan Katz, were ranked among the top 22 eligible judokas for men and top 14 for women in the IJF World Ranking List of 30 May 2016, while 2014 Commonwealth Games bronze medallist Chloe Rayner at women's extra-lightweight (48 kg) earned a continental quota spot from the Oceania region as the highest-ranked Australian judoka outside of direct qualifying position. The judo team was officially named to the Olympic roster on 10 June 2016.

Men

Women

Modern pentathlon

Australia has qualified the following athletes based on the results from the 2015 Asian/Oceania Championships.

Rowing

Australia has qualified a total of eight boats for each of the following rowing classes into the Olympic regatta. Majority of the rowing crews had confirmed Olympic places for their boats at the 2015 FISA World Championships in Lac d'Aiguebelette, France, while a men's single sculls rower had added one more boat to the Australian roster as a result of his top three finish at the 2016 European & Final Qualification Regatta in Lucerne, Switzerland.

A total of 20 rowers (13 men and 7 women) were officially named to the Australian roster for the Games on 7 July 2016, with Kerry Hore leading the rowing team and racing with the women's quadruple sculls crew at her fourth Olympics.

On 26 July 2016, the women's eight berth was awarded to the Australian rowing team, as a response to the removal of four boats held by the Russians from FISA due to their previous doping bans and their implications in the "disappearing positive methodology" set out in the McClaren Report on Russia's state-sponsored doping.

Men

Women

Qualification Legend: FA=Final A (medal); FB=Final B (non-medal); FC=Final C (non-medal); FD=Final D (non-medal); FE=Final E (non-medal); FF=Final F (non-medal); SA/B=Semifinals A/B; SC/D=Semifinals C/D; SE/F=Semifinals E/F; QF=Quarterfinals; R=Repechage

Rugby sevens

Men's tournament

The Australian men's team qualified for the Games by winning the 2015 FORU Men's Sevens Championships.

Team roster

Group play

Quarterfinal

Classification semifinal (5–8)

Seventh place match

Women's tournament

The Australian women's team qualified for the Games by virtue of a third-place finish in the 2014–15 World Rugby Women's Sevens Series.

Team roster

Group play

Quarterfinal

Semifinal

Gold medal match

Sailing

Australian sailors have qualified one boat in each of the following classes through the 2014 ISAF Sailing World Championships, the individual fleet Worlds, and Oceanian qualifying regattas. On 4 December 2015, the Australian Olympic Committee had announced the first three double-handed crews to compete at the Games, including defending champions Iain Jensen and Nathan Outteridge (49er) and Mathew Belcher (470). Laser sailor Tom Burton was named to the Australian team in March 2016, and was followed by two female sailing crews (Smith & Ryan in 470, and Stoddart in Laser Radial) two months later. Finn yachtsman Jake Lilley rounded out the selection at the end of May 2016.

Australian Sailing has decided to reject quota places earned by the sailors in the women's RS:X and 49erFX classes due to its performance standards set for the Games.

Men

Women

Mixed

M = Medal race;  EL = Eliminated – did not advance into the medal race; DSQ – Disqualified; RDG – Redress given; UFD – "U" flag disqualification
Discard is crossed out and does not count for the overall result.

Shooting

Australian shooters have achieved quota places for the following events by virtue of their best finishes at the 2014 and 2015 ISSF World Championships, the 2015 ISSF World Cup series, and Oceanian Championships, as long as they have obtained a minimum qualifying score (MQS) by 31 March 2016. They must compete in two selection meets of the Australia Cup in Sydney to attain their benchmark scores and assure their selection to the Olympic team.

The Australian Olympic Committee confirmed a roster of sixteen shooters to the Olympic team in a selection event on 8 April 2016, with Belarusian-born Lalita Yauhleuskaya remarkably going to her sixth Olympics, reigning World champion Warren Potent to his fifth, and pistol ace Daniel Repacholi to his fourth.

Olympic trap veterans Michael Diamond and Adam Vella were initially selected to the team, but both were challenged by an appeal from rookie Mitchell Iles against his non-selection. Following criminal charges related to the use of firearms and drunk-driving, Diamond lost his bid to compete at seventh Olympics on 30 June 2016. With Diamond ruled ineligible for the Games, Shooting Australia had decided to officially nominate Vella and Iles, who won his appeal to the Court of Arbitration for Sport (CAS) one week earlier.

Men

Women

Qualification Legend: Q = Qualify for the next round; q = Qualify for the bronze medal (shotgun)

Swimming

Australian swimmers have so far achieved qualifying standards in the following events (up to a maximum of 2 swimmers in each event at the Olympic Qualifying Time (OQT), and potentially 1 at the Olympic Selection Time (OST)): To assure their nomination to the Olympic team, swimmers must finish in the top two of each individual pool events under both the benchmark standard and the FINA A-cut at the 2016 Australian Championships and Olympic Trials ( 7 to 14 April) in Adelaide.

A total of 34 swimmers (15 men and 19 women) were named to the Australian team for the Olympics at the end of the Australian Championships, featuring 2015 World backstroke double champions Mitch Larkin and Emily Seebohm, sisters Bronte and Cate Campbell, siblings David and Emma McKeon, London 2012 medallists Alicia Coutts and Bronte Barratt, and freestyle aces Cameron McEvoy (sprint) and Mack Horton (long-distance). Two months later, London 2012 silver medallist James Magnussen, along with his teammates James Roberts and rookie Matthew Abood were added to the team, as FINA confirmed Australia's quota spot in the men's 4 × 100 m freestyle relay, finishing among the top four nations, not yet qualified, in the World Ranking List as of 31 May 2016.

Men

Women

Synchronized swimming

Australia has fielded a squad of nine synchronized swimmers to compete in the women's duet and team events, by virtue of their top national finish for Oceania at the 2015 FINA World Championships. The full synchronized swimming squad, led by London 2012 Olympian Bianca Hammett, was announced on 9 July 2016.

Table tennis

Australia has fielded a team of four table tennis players (two men and two women) at the Olympics. David Powell and Chris Yan secured the spots in the men's singles, while Olympic veteran Lay Jian Fang and Melissa Tapper, the first Australian to compete at both Olympics and Paralympics, did so in the women's singles, by virtue of their top three finish respectively at the Oceania Qualification Tournament in Bendigo, Victoria.

Hu Heiming and Ziyu Zhang were each awarded the third spot to build the men's and women's teams for the Games as the top Oceania nation in the ITTF Olympic Rankings.

Men

Women

Taekwondo

Australia entered four athletes into the taekwondo competition. Sisters Caroline and 2012 Olympian Carmen Marton, along with the latter's husband Safwan Khalil, and Iranian-born fighter Hayder Shkara secured spots in the women's lightweight (57 kg), women's welterweight (67 kg), men's flyweight (58 kg), and men's welterweight category (80 kg) respectively by virtue of their top finish at the 2016 Oceania Qualification Tournament in Port Moresby.

Tennis

Australia named a team of ten tennis players to travel to the Olympics (excluding top players Bernard Tomic and Nick Kyrgios). Rookies John Millman (world no. 66) and Thanasi Kokkinakis (world no. 328) qualified directly for the men's singles, as two of the top 56 eligible players in the ATP World Rankings, while Daria Gavrilova (world no. 51) and her doubles partner and three-time Olympian Samantha Stosur (world no .14) did so for the women's singles based on their WTA World Rankings as of 6 June 2016. Chris Guccione and John Peers were selected to compete in the men's doubles. Following the withdrawal of several tennis players from the Games, Jordan Thompson (world no. 90) and Sam Groth (world no. 115) received spare ITF Olympic places to join Kokkinakis and Millman in the men's singles, as well as the sisters Anastasia and Arina Rodionova in the women's doubles.

Men

Women

Mixed

Triathlon

Australia has qualified a total of six triathletes for the Olympics. Two-time Olympian Emma Moffatt secured her Olympic spot in the women's triathlon, as a result of her gold medal victory at the 2016 Oceanian Championships in Gisborne, New Zealand, while the men's triathlon spot was awarded to the nation's top finisher Ryan Bailie. The rest of the Australian triathletes (Royle, Fisher, Densham, and Gentle) were ranked among the eligible top 40 in their respective events based on the ITU Olympic Qualification List as of 15 May 2016.

Volleyball

Beach
Two Australia women's beach volleyball teams qualified directly for the Olympics; one by virtue of their nation's top 15 placement in the FIVB Olympic Rankings as of 13 June 2016, and the other by winning the final match over Vanuatu at the AVC Continental Cup in Cairns. These places were awarded to London 2012 Olympian Louise Bawden and her rookie partner Taliqua Clancy, as well as Peruvian-born Mariafe Artacho and Nicole Laird.

Water polo

Summary

Men's tournament

Australia men's water polo team was confirmed by the NOC to compete at the Olympic Games through an Oceania continental selection.

Team roster

Group play

Women's tournament

Australia women's water polo team was confirmed by the NOC to compete at the Olympic Games through an Oceania continental selection.

Team roster

Group play

Quarterfinal

Classification semifinal (5–8)

Fifth place match

Weightlifting

Australia has qualified one male and one female weightlifter for the Rio Olympics by virtue of a top five national finish (for men) and top four (for women), respectively, at the 2016 Oceania Championships. The team must allocate these places to individual athletes by 20 June 2016.

Commonwealth Games runner-up Simplice Ribouem (men's 94 kg) and Tia-Clair Toomey (women's 58 kg) were nominated to the Olympic roster, based on their performances at the Oceanian Championships.

Wrestling

Australia has qualified four wrestlers for each of the following weight classes into the Olympic competition, as a result of their semifinal triumphs at the 2016 African & Oceania Qualification Tournament. The entire wrestling squad was announced on 12 April 2016, with Sahit Prizreni remarkably going to his third Olympics after he represented Albania in 2004 and 2008.

On 15 July 2016, the Australian Olympic Committee decided to revoke the license owned by Vinod Kumar Dahiya and his nomination to the Olympic team, following an anti-doping violation.

Men's freestyle

Men's Greco-Roman

Media coverage
The Seven Network won the television rights to broadcast the next three Olympic Games.

See also
Australia at the 2016 Summer Paralympics

References

External links

 Australian Olympic Committee Rio Portal
 
 Rio Olympics 2016 Football Schedule in Australia Time – AEST
 

Olympics
2016
Nations at the 2016 Summer Olympics